Xue Juan may refer to:

Xue Juan (javelin thrower) (born 1986), Chinese javelin thrower
Xue Juan (table tennis) (born 1989), Chinese para table tennis player